Ananyan, also transliterated as Ananian, is an Armenian surname. Notable people with the surname include:

Levon Ananyan (1946–2013), Armenian journalist and translator
Vakhtang Ananyan (1905–1980), Armenian Soviet writer
Zhirayr Ananyan (1934–2004), Armenian playwright

Armenian-language surnames